Ajdar Ajdar oghlu Aliyev (born 1937) was an Azerbaijani statesman, Chairman of the Azerbaijan State Statistics Committee (1989–1993), Minister of Construction of the Azerbaijan SSR (1986–1989), Minister of Industrial Construction of the Azerbaijan SSR (1983–1986).

Biography 
Ajdar Aliyev was born in 1937. He graduated from the Azerbaijan Institute of Oil and Chemistry.

He started his career in 1959 as a technician at the Designing Institute of Azerbaijan State Oil Industry Enterprises ("Azerneftdovlatlayiha"), and became the foreman of the Krasnoyarsk Construction Department of the "Sibtexqurdashdirma" Trust. Then, for seven years, he worked in Sumgayit and Baku (department No. 3) installation departments of the Azerbaijan Petrochemical Installation Trust in various engineering and technical positions, and from 1967 he worked as the deputy head of the Department of Installation and Special Construction Works of the Council of Ministers of the Azerbaijan SSR.

Ajdar Aliyev had been the Deputy Minister of Industrial Construction of Azerbaijan SSR since 1970, Minister of Industrial Construction since 1983, and Minister of Construction since 1986. Since 1989, he had been the chairman of the State Statistics Committee of Azerbaijan.

Ajdar Aliyev had been a member of the CPSU since 1967. Elected deputy of the 11th convocation of the Supreme Soviet of the Azerbaijan SSR. He was awarded the "Badge of Honour" order.

References 

1937 births
Living people
Azerbaijan Communist Party (1920) politicians
Azerbaijan State Oil and Industry University alumni